L'Hortus Camaldulensis di Napoli, also known as the Camaldoli garden, is a private botanical garden in Naples, Italy.

See also 
 List of botanical gardens in Italy

References 
 BGCI entry
 Convention on Biological Diversity
 Conrad Malte-Brun, Universal Geography: Or a Description of All Parts of the World, on a New Plan, Boston : Wells and Lilly, 1829, volume VII, page 712. (Translation of Précis de la géographie universelle, Paris.)
 William Thomas Horner Fox Strangways, letter to William Henry Fox Talbot, October 18, 1822.
 Antonio La Gala, "Vomero. Storia e storie" at page 59 
 

Botanical gardens in Italy
Tourist attractions in Naples
Gardens in Campania